The 1995 NCAA Division III women's basketball tournament was the 14th annual tournament hosted by the NCAA to determine the national champion of Division III women's collegiate basketball in the United States.

Defending champions Capital defeated Wisconsin–Oshkosh in the championship game, 59–55, to claim the Crusaders' second Division III national title. 

The championship rounds were hosted by Capital University in Columbus, Ohio.

Bracket

Final Four

All-tournament team
 Katie Mang, Capital
 Jill Walker, Capital
 Natalie DeMichei, Wisconsin–Oshkosh
 Wendy Wangerin, Wisconsin–Oshkosh
 Laura Witte, St. Thomas (MN)

See also
 1995 NCAA Division III men's basketball tournament
 1995 NCAA Division I women's basketball tournament
 1995 NCAA Division II women's basketball tournament
 1995 NAIA Division I women's basketball tournament
 1995 NAIA Division II women's basketball tournament

References

 
NCAA Division III women's basketball tournament
1994 in sports in Wisconsin